Jasper Smit and Martijn van Haasteren were the defending champions but chose not to compete this year.

Rohan Bopanna and Adam Feeney won the title, defeating German pair Lars Burgsmüller and Mischa Zverev in the final,

Seeds

Draw

Draw

References

External links
 Main Draw (ATP)
 Official ATP

Irish Open